Victor Fazio may refer to:

 Victor H. Fazio (1942–2022), former Democratic congressman from California
 Victor Warren Fazio (1940–2015), Australian surgeon